Jordan Uelese (born 24 January 1997) is an Australian professional rugby union player for the Melbourne Rebels in Super Rugby. He has been capped for the Australian national team. His usual position is hooker.

Early life
Uelese was born in Wellington, New Zealand, where he started playing rugby for the Oriental Rongotai club. He moved with his family to Melbourne at the age of eleven and attended St. Kevin's College in Melbourne. As a teenageer he was a loose forward before switching to hooker, the position he played for the Rebels Under-20 side in the National Championships.

Career
Uelese was selected for the Australia Under 20 team two years in a row, playing at the World Rugby Championships in Manchester in 2016 and then in Georgia in 2017. Uelese made his Super Rugby debut in the opening round of the 2017 season against the Blues as a replacement for Patrick Leafa in a defeat for the Rebels, becoming the third 'home-grown' player for the Rebels. In September 2017 he made his debut for Australia against the Springboks in a 23–23 draw at nib Stadium in Perth.

Super Rugby statistics

References

External links
 

1997 births
Australian rugby union players
Rugby union players from Melbourne
Australian sportspeople of Samoan descent
Australian people of New Zealand descent
Australia international rugby union players
Rugby union hookers
Melbourne Rebels players
Melbourne Rising players
Living people
New Zealand expatriate sportspeople in Australia
Rugby union players from Wellington City